The following is a list of notable graduates of Robert College and Robert Academy (RA), American College for Girls (ACG), Robert Yuksek, which were the subsections of Robert College until the merger of 1971.

A 
 Halide Edib Adıvar, novelist
 Hranoush Agaganian (Madame Bey), wife of a diplomat and operator of a center for boxing in the U.S.
 Zeki Alasya, actor
 Safiye Ali, first Turkish woman to become a medical doctor
 Engin Ardıç, writer
 Tomur Atagok, artist, painter
 Türkkaya Ataöv, academic and columnist

B
 Henri Barki, professor of management information systems
 Selçuk Bayraktar, engineer and businessperson
 Mihri Belli, socialist politician, author
 Izak Benbasat, professor of management information systems
 Nihat Berker, professor of physics
 Feyyaz Berker, businessperson
 Halil Berktay, historian
 Serdar Bilgili, businessperson
 Refika Birgül, food writer
 Behice Boran, politician
 Cem Boyner, businessman, politician
 Ayşe Buğra, sociologist, economist
Serdar Bulun, physician, professor and researcher of gynecology

C 
 Alev Lytle Croutier, ACG 63, novelist
 Halet Çambel, archaeologist, first female Turkish olympian
 Zeynep Çelik, architect, architectural historian
 İsmail Cem, politician, former foreign minister of Turkey
 Engin Cezzar, actor, director
 Tansu Çiller, first female Turkish prime minister

D 
 Arwa Damon, journalist, CNN correspondent
 Xhafer Deva, entrepreneur
 Agop Dilaçar, linguist
 Abidin Dino, artist
 Michalis Dorizas, sportsperson, bronze medal winner for stone throw and javelin throw in the 1906 Summer Olympics
 Haldun Dormen, actor, playwright
 Tsanko Dyustabanov, Bulgarian revolutionary

E 
 Bülent Ecevit, former Turkish prime minister
 Rahşan Ecevit, politician
 Nejat Eczacıbaşı, entrepreneur
 Neşe Erberk, businessperson, Miss Europe '84
 Marcel Erdal, linguist
 Refik Erduran, playwright, columnist and writer
 Aslı Erdoğan, writer
 Tunç Erem, academic
 Genco Erkal, actor, playwright
 Münir Ertegün, diplomat
 Şenes Erzik, UEFA vice president
 Evgenios Evgenidis, Greek shipping businessperson and benefactor (died 1954)

F 
 Moris Farhi, vice-president of International PEN
 Maureen Freely, ACG 71, journalist, novelist, translator-notably of Orhan Pamuk's works

G 

 Emre Gönensay, politician
 Gilbert Hovey Grosvenor, president of the National Geographic Society (1920–1954)
 Kasım Gülek, politician, secretary general of the Republican People's Party

H 
 Talat Sait Halman, Turkey's first minister of culture, academic
 Erdem Helvacıoğlu, composer, sound designer, musician
 Agop Hacikyan, academic, writer

I
 İsmail Cem İpekçi, politician 
 Ahmet İsvan, politician
 Todor Ivanchov, former Bulgarian prime minister

K 
 Cevat Şakir Kabaağaçlı, writer
 Cemal Kafadar, professor of Middle-Eastern history at Harvard University
 Nur al-Din Kahala, Syrian politician
 Cem Karaca, musician
 Mehmet Emin Karamehmet, entrepreneur
 Osman Kavala, philanthropist
 Ömer Kavur, movie producer
 Hagop Kevorkian, historian of art, orientalist
 Suna Kıraç, businessperson
 Ömer Koç, businessperson
 Rahmi Koç, businessperson
 Vasif Kortun, musician, curator
 Spiro Kostof, architectural historian, chronicler of urban form
 Karolos Koun, Greek theater director
 Shavarsh Krissian, Armenian writer and athlete
 Ayşe Kulin, Writer, columnist
 Aptullah Kuran, academic
 Timur Kuran, academic, economics professor
 Pınar Kür, writer, professor

L 
 Levon Larents, Armenian writer and journalist

M 
 Perihan Mağden, RC 79, writer and commentator
 Etyen Mahçupyan, columnist, journalist
 Mangasar Magurditch Mangasarian, rationalist and secularist writer in the United States
 Roni Margulies, poet, author, translator and political activist
 Mgirdiç Migiryan, Olympian
 Konstantin Vladov Muraviev, former Bulgarian prime minister
 Lale Müldür, poet and writer

N 
 Gülru Necipoğlu, historian of Islamic art
 Leyla Neyzi, anthropologist, historian
 Apostolos Nikolaidis, track and field athlete and founder of Panathinaikos
 Sevan Nişanyan intellectual, travel writer, researcher and polymath

O
 Kamil Ocak, former minister of state
 Hakkı Ögelman – physicist and astrophysicist
 A. Sumru Özsoy, academic and linguist
 Hüsnü Özyeğin, businessperson

P 
 Orhan Pamuk, RA 70, writer (2006 Nobel Laureate in Literature)
 Şevket Pamuk, professor of economic history at Boğaziçi University, former president of European Historical Economics Society
 Vahram Papazyan, Olympic athlete
 Mihri Pektaş, politician, one of the first 18 female parliament members of Turkey
 Mustafa Pultar, academic and writer
 Stefan Panaretov, Bulgarian diplomat and professor

Q 
 Parashqevi Qiriazi, Albanian teacher and member of the Congress of Monastir, which decided the Albanian alphabet

R 
 Halit Refiğ, film director, writer, producer
 Dani Rodrik, professor of international political economy at the John F. Kennedy School of Government, Harvard University

S 
 Vasileios Sachinis, leader of the Greek World War II resistance in southern Albania/Northern Epirus
 Selim Sarper, ambassador to the U.N., Minister of Foreign Affairs
 Nevra Serezli, film, stage, television and voice actress
 Ayşe Soysal, former president of Boğaziçi University
 Konstantin Stoilov, former Bulgarian prime minister
 Eve Sussman, artist
 Kenan Şahin, entrepreneur, scientist
 Celâl Şengör, RA 73, geologist
 Bülent Şenver, businessperson

T 
 Çiğdem Talu, composer
 Ülkü Tamer, poet, journalist, actor and translator
 Tosun Terzioğlu, president of Sabancı University, mathematician

U 
 Mina Urgan, academic, translator, author and socialist politician

V 
 Gregory Vlastos, writer, scholar of ancient philosophy
 İhsan Emre Vural, RC 04, athlete (rowing), the only Turkish world champion in rowing

Y 
 Alp Yalman, businessperson, ex-president of the Galatasaray Sports Club
 Nur Yalman, social anthropologist
 Nihal Yeğinobalı, writer
 K. Aslihan Yener, archaeologist

References

External links
 Robert College website
 Robert College Alumni Association

Robert College
Robert College Alumni